Kaliadeh Palace is a palace located on the banks of Shipra in Ujjain, Madhya Pradesh. It is one of the most famous historical landmarks of Ujjain. Once recorded as beautiful temple of the Sun on thebanks of River Shipra with two tanks named Surya Kunda and Brahma Kunda. The palace was built by the Sultan of Mandu in 1458 A.D. during the time of Mahmud Khilji. The central dome of the palace is a beautiful example of Persian architecture, and the Persian inscriptions here record the visits of Emperor Akbar and Jehangir to this palace.

The palace was damaged by Pindaris during the Pindari war but was restored by Maharaja Sir Madho Rao Scindia of Gwalior in 1920.

References

External links
 Wikikmapia

History of Malwa
Tourist attractions in Ujjain
Buildings and structures in Ujjain
Monuments and memorials in Madhya Pradesh
Culture of Ujjain